Gustaf Richard Nyman (12 October 1874 – 14 May 1952) was a Finnish sport shooter, who competed in the 1908 and the 1912 Summer Olympics, and won a world championship bronze.

Nyman won bronze in 300 metre free rifle 40 shots standing event at the 1914 ISSF World Shooting Championships.

His given names have also appeared as Gustav Richard and Kustaa Rikard. He often used the initials G. R. as his first name.

He received his journeyman papers as a plater in 1894.

Sources

References

1874 births
1952 deaths
Finnish male sport shooters
ISSF rifle shooters
Olympic shooters of Finland
Shooters at the 1908 Summer Olympics
Shooters at the 1912 Summer Olympics